Inroads is an album by American banjoist Béla Fleck, released in 1986.

Track listing 
All tracks written by Béla Fleck
 "Toninio" – 4:09
 "Somerset" – 3:09
 "Cecata" – 0:55
 "Four Wheel Drive" – 3:53
 "Ireland" – 6:48
 "Perplexed" – 6:21
 "The Old Country" – 2:58
 "Hudson's Bay" – 5:22
 "Close to Home" – 4:02

The string chart on "The Old Country" was composed by Edgar Meyer. "Cecata" was a group improvisation. Kirby Shelstad's intro to "Perplexed" was also improvised.

Personnel
 Béla Fleck - banjo	
 Timothy Britton - Uilleann pipes
 Sam Bush - mandolin
 John Cowan - bass
 Jerry Douglas - dobro
 Connie Heard - violin on "The Old Country"
 Kenny Malone - drums
 Edgar Meyer - bass
 Mark O'Connor - violin
 Tom Roady - percussion
 Mark Schatz - bass
 Kirby Shelstad - drums, vibraphone on "Close to Home"
 Recorded and mixed by Bil VornDick

References

1986 albums
Béla Fleck albums
Rounder Records albums